William Norris may refer to:

 William Norris (antiquarian) (1719–1791), English clergyman and antiquarian
 William Norris (CEO) (1911–2006), CEO of Control Data Corporation
 William Norris (locomotive builder) (1802–1867), American steam locomotive builder
 Sir William Norris (judge) (died 1859), Chief Justice of British Ceylon, father of William Edward Norris
 William Edward Norris (1847–1925), British author
 William Foxley Norris (1859–1937), Dean of York
 William Norris (Confederate signal officer) (1820–1896)
 William Hutchinson Norris (1800–1893), American military officer and politician who founded the city of Americana in Brazil
 Sir William Norris, 1st Baronet (c. 1658–1702), Member of Parliament for Liverpool, England
 William Albert Norris (1927–2017), former judge for the United States Court of Appeals for the Ninth Circuit
 William Norris III (1936–2016), American judge
 William Norreys (1441–1507), also often spelt Norris (1433–1507), Lancastrian soldier during the War of the Roses
 William Norreys (gentleman usher), Gentleman Usher of the Black Rod and Order of the Garter; Member of Parliament for Windsor
 William Norris (1501–68) (1501–1568), Member of Parliament for Liverpool
 William Norreys (Berkshire MP) (c. 1548–1579), soldier and Member of Parliament for Berkshire
 William Norris (English cricketer) (1830–1889), English clergyman and cricketer
 William Norris (Wellington cricketer) (1908-1988), New Zealand cricketer
 William C. Norris (general) (born 1926), United States Air Force general